Sebastián Rodrigo Massa (born 4 February 1975) is an Argentine former rower. He competed in the men's lightweight double sculls event at the 2000 Summer Olympics.

References

External links
 

1975 births
Living people
Argentine male rowers
Olympic rowers of Argentina
Rowers at the 2000 Summer Olympics
Rowers from Buenos Aires
Pan American Games medalists in rowing
Pan American Games gold medalists for Argentina
Pan American Games silver medalists for Argentina
Pan American Games bronze medalists for Argentina
Rowers at the 1999 Pan American Games
Rowers at the 2003 Pan American Games
Medalists at the 1999 Pan American Games